The King George V Silver Jubilee Medal is a commemorative medal, instituted to celebrate the 25th anniversary of the accession of King George V.

Issue
This medal was awarded as a personal souvenir by King George V to commemorate his Silver Jubilee. It was awarded to the Royal Family and selected officers of state, officials and servants of the Royal Household, ministers, government officials, mayors, public servants, local government officials, members of the navy, army, air force and police in Britain, her colonies and Dominions.

For Coronation and Jubilee medals, the practice up until 1977 was that United Kingdom authorities decided on a total number to be produced, then allocated a proportion to each of the Commonwealth countries and Crown dependencies and possessions. The award of the medals was then at the discretion of the local government authority, who were free to decide who would be awarded a medal and why.

A total of 85,234 medals were awarded, including
6,500 to Australians
7,500 to Canadians
1,500 to New Zealanders

The medal was worn with other coronation and jubilee medals, immediately after campaign and polar medals, and before long service awards. Ladies could wear the medal near their left shoulder with the ribbon tied in the form of a bow.

Description
 Designed by Sir William Goscombe John.
 A circular, silver medal, 1.25 inches in diameter. The obverse features the conjoined effigies of King George V and Queen Mary, crowned and robed, facing left. The legend around the top edge reads "GEORGE • V • AND • QUEEN • MARY • MAY • VI • MCMXXXV".
 The reverse displays the Royal Cypher "GRI", surmounted by an Imperial Crown. At the left is the date "MAY 6 / 1910" in two lines, and at right the date: "MAY 6 / 1935". The border is ornate.
 The purple ribbon is 1.25 inches wide, with three narrow stripes of dark blue, white, and dark blue at each edge. The three narrow stripes are 0.25 inches wide in total.
 It was awarded unnamed.

Notable recipients

Australia
The following list includes some notable Australians who received the King George V Silver Jubilee Medal. It is not an exhaustive list of recipients.
 Wilmot Hudson Fysh
Eric Harrison
Walter Hartwell James
William Dartnell Johnson
Norbert Keenan
Allan MacDonald
Alexander McCallum
Fanny Reading
Elizabeth Laurie Rees

New Zealand
The following list includes notable New Zealanders who received the King George V Silver Jubilee Medal, and is not an exhaustive list of recipients.

A
 Hugh Acland
 James Allen
 Stephen Allen
 John Allum
 George James Anderson
 Alfred Ansell
 Gilbert Archey
 John Archer
 Harry Atmore
 Alfred Averill
 Hugh Ayson

B
 Esther Mary Baber
 George Baildon
 William Henry Peter Barber
 Bill Barnard
 Louis Barnett
 John Barton
 Alice Basten
 Blanche Baughan
 Harold Beauchamp
 John Beanland
 Campbell Begg
 Francis Bell
 Charles Bellringer
 Horace Belshaw
 Frederick Bennett
 Carl Berendsen
 George Bertrand
 Marmaduke Bethell
 Arthur Bignell
 John Bitchener
 William Blomfield
 Tom Bloodworth
 William Bodkin
 Grafton Bothamley
 Fred Bowerbank
 John H. Boyes
 Tom Brindle
 Walter Broadfoot
 Matthew Brodie
 David Buddo
 Lindsay Buick
 Peter Buck
 Thomas Burnett

C
 Keith Caldwell
 John Callan
 Hugh Campbell
 Blanche Carnachan
 Walter Carncross
 Clyde Carr
 Charles Chapman
 Frederick Chapman
 Cecil Cherrington
 Frederick de Jersey Clere
 Cecil Clinkard
 George Clinkard
 Gordon Coates
 James Coates
 John Cobbe
 David Coleman
 Jeremiah Connolly
 James Craigie
 Samuel Crookes

D
 Berkeley Dallard
 Eliot Davis
 George Davis-Goff
 Frederick de la Mare
 Harold Dickie
 James Donald
 John Duigan

E
 Thomas Easterfield
 Ned Ellison
 Bill Endean

F
 Mark Fagan
 Norrie Falla
 Willi Fels
 Lindo Ferguson
 William Hughes Field
 James Lloyd Findlay
 Billy Fitchett
 George Forbes
 Flora Forde
 Thomas Forsyth
 John Robert Fow
 Annie Fraer
 Janet Fraser
 Peter Fraser

G
 Victor Galway
 Mac Geddes
 William Girling
 Billy Glenn
 C. F. Goldie
 Samuel Goldstein
 Henry Greenslade
 James Gunson

H
 Adam Hamilton
 John Ronald Hamilton
 Alfred Harding
 James Hargest
 Arthur Paul Harper
 Richard Hawke
 Oswald Hawken
 James Hay
 Edward Healy
 Joe Heenan
 James Hight
 Frederick Hilgendorf
 John Bird Hine
 Thomas Hislop
 Frank Hockly
 James Thomas Hogan
 Henry Holland
 Keith Holyoake
 Ted Howard
 William Hunt
 Thomas Alexander Hunter
 Thomas Anderson Hunter
 George Hutchison

I
 Lindsay Merritt Inglis
 Tracy Inglis
 Leonard Isitt (minister)
 Leonard Isitt (aviator)

J
 David Jones
 Fred Jones

K
 Truby King
 Joseph Kinsey
 Cybele Kirk
 Bert Kyle

L
 Robert Laidlaw
 Mary Lambie
 Frederic Lang
 Frank Langstone
 John A. Lee
 Joseph Linklater
 James Liston
 Henry Livingstone
 Charles Luke
 Frederick Lye
 Douglas Lysnar

M
 Lance Macey
 John MacGregor
 Clutha Mackenzie
 Charles MacMillan
 John Andrew MacPherson
 Ernest Marsden
 John Mason
 Rex Mason
 Jack Massey
 Walter William Massey
 Robert Masters
 Elizabeth McCombs
 Donald McGavin
 William McIntyre
 Robert McKeen
 Alexander McLeod
 James McLeod
 Peter McSkimming
 Ellen Melville
 Reginald Miles
 Frank Milner
 Walter Moffatt
 Richard Moore
 Alan Mulgan
 Jim Munro

N
 Jimmy Nash
 Walter Nash
 Edward Newman
 Āpirana Ngata
 Erima Northcroft
 Charles Norwood
 William Nosworthy
 Emily Nutsey

O
 James O'Brien
 Tom O'Byrne
 Walter Oliver
 John Ormond
 Thomas O'Shea
 Hubert Ostler

P
 George John Park
 Ronald Park
 Bill Parry
 George Pascoe
 George Pearce
 Geoffrey Peren
 Philip De La Perrelle
 Hugh Poland
 William Polson
 Dugald Poppelwell

R
 Alfred Ransom
 John Reed
 Vernon Reed
 Stewart Reid
 Heaton Rhodes
 Thomas William Rhodes
 Arthur Shapton Richards
 Randolph Ridling
 Frank Rolleston
 John Rolleston
 Harold Rushworth
 Andrew Hamilton Russell
 George Warren Russell

S
 Albert Samuel
 Michael Joseph Savage
 Bill Schramm
 Tom Seddon
 Bob Semple
 Emily Siedeberg
 William Sinclair-Burgess
 George John Smith
 Stephen Smith
 Sydney George Smith
 William Snodgrass
 Robert Speight
 Arthur Stallworthy
 Charles Statham
 Edith Statham
 William Stevenson
 William Stewart
 William Downie Stewart Jr
 Duncan Stout
 Alexander Stuart
 Bill Sullivan
 Dan Sullivan
 George Sykes

T
 Takurua Tamarau
 William Taverner
 Te Puea Hērangi
 Te Rangi Hīroa
 Hoani Te Heuheu Tūkino VI
 Taite Te Tomo
 Henry Thacker
 Algernon Thomas
 Te Hata Tipoki
 Eruera Tirikatene
 Tonga Mahuta
 Jonathan Trevethick
 George Troup

V
 Bill Veitch

W
 Fred Waite
 Vincent Ward
 Paddy Webb
 Campbell West-Watson
 James Whyte
 Thomas Wilford
 Thomas Wilkes
 Charles Wilkinson
 Kenneth Williams
 Ida Willis
 George Witty
 Ward Wohlmann
 Cecil J. Wray
 Robert Wright

Y
 Alexander Young
 Bruce Young
 W. Gray Young

Papua New Guinea 

 Hubert Murray
 Henry Newton (bishop)

South Africa 
 Julia Solly

References

External links
Veterans Affairs Canada
NZDF Medals

Silver Jubilee of George V
Civil awards and decorations of Australia
Civil awards and decorations of Canada
Civil awards and decorations of New Zealand
Civil awards and decorations of the United Kingdom
Military decorations and medals of South Africa
George V
1935 establishments in the United Kingdom
Awards established in 1935
Awards disestablished in 1935